Caridad Vizcay (born 21 February 1978) is a Cuban handball player for Santiago de Cuba and the Cuban national team.

She participated at the 2015 World Women's Handball Championship.

References

1978 births
Living people
Cuban female handball players
Place of birth missing (living people)
Handball players at the 2007 Pan American Games
Pan American Games medalists in handball
Pan American Games silver medalists for Cuba
Medalists at the 2007 Pan American Games
21st-century Cuban women